Worcester State University (WSU) is a public university in Worcester, Massachusetts. It was founded in 1874 and enrolls nearly 5,500 undergraduates and over 900 graduate students.

History

Founded in 1874 as the Massachusetts State Normal School at Worcester, WSU was the fifth of nine teacher training colleges in the state. Spurred by the success of a city-run normal school founded two years earlier, its school committee successfully petitioned the Massachusetts General Court for a state-sponsored institution in Worcester. The original campus was located in a Second Empire-style stone building on St. Ann's Hill, near the city's downtown. By 1900, the campus included a president's house, the "Stoddard Terrace" residence hall, and a turreted gymnasium annex. This site would serve WSU for nearly sixty years until the current Chandler Street campus opened in 1932.

The first "principal" of WSU, Elias Harlow Russell (1874–1909), shaped the school's early curriculum. A pioneer in the Child Study Movement that emphasized childhood development and educational reform efforts, Russell partnered with colleague G. Stanley Hall, who later became President of Clark University, to develop a program that placed normal school students in city schools. Russell was later succeeded by Francis Randsom Lane (1909–1912).

In the 1920s, WSU followed national trends in teacher education by introducing a broader array of college courses and a Bachelor of Science in Education degree in 1921 culminating in a new designation of State Teachers College in 1932. The Great Depression threatened the College as the state proposed cost-cutting measures that would eliminate many schools. Presidents Dr. William B. Aspinwall (1912–1940) and Clinton E. Carpenter (1940–1946) led the college through this crisis and set the stage for post-war development under the presidency of Eugene A. Sullivan (1947–1970).

President Sullivan oversaw the expansion of the WSU curriculum. In 1952, the college introduced a Master of Science in Education, and in 1963, a Bachelor of Arts degree. In 1960 the school was designated Worcester State College. Sullivan also oversaw the development of a collegiate athletic system, introducing varsity sports in 1950 and constructing a new gymnasium building in 1958. President Robert E. Leestamper (1970–1975), further expanded graduate programs and introduced professional programs such as nursing and business. In 1973, Chandler Village was created as the first residence halls on the Chandler Street campus.

The tenure of presidents Joseph J. Orze (1975–1982) and Phillip D. Vario (1982–1992) expanded the campus with the addition of a student center and a new residence hall, named Dowden Hall, as well as continued support of varsity sports and degree offerings in speech and occupational therapy. Under the tenure of President Vario, the school joined the Coalition of Urban and Metropolitan Universities. The Worcester State Foundation was created in 1994, during the presidency of Kaylan K. Ghosh (1992–2002), to support school fundraising efforts. During the following decade, the campus grew to include the new Ghosh Science and Technology Center, as well as an additional residence hall and parking structure, which was built during the tenure of President Janelle C. Ashley (2002–2011).

In 2010, WSU reorganized into two schools: the School of Humanities and Social Sciences and the School of Education, Health, and Natural Sciences. That same year, the state granted Massachusetts State Colleges, including Worcester State, university status.

In 2011, Worcester State installed its eleventh president, Barry M. Maloney. That same year, students and faculty relaunched the Worcester Spy, a newspaper originally founded in 1775.

At the end of the 2020–2021 academic year, nearby Becker College closed, and transferred custody of their academic records to WSU.

Campus
WSU is located on Chandler Street in the Tatnuck neighborhood of Worcester. The 58-acre campus includes woods and wetlands, and features an east-facing slope with buildings directly on its hillside.

In the late nineteenth century, the campus was the site of "Willow Farm", home of William Sever Lincoln (1811–1889), who led the 34th Massachusetts Infantry Regiment during the American Civil War and was brevetted Brigadier General in 1865. He was the son of Levi Lincoln Jr., former Governor of Massachusetts.

In 1930, the original site was acquired for WSU's new campus and, in 1942, an additional thirty-five acres were added, forming the current layout. Today, about thirty-percent of full-time students reside on campus.

Buildings

Ghosh Science and Technology Center (2000): The center is named after former President Ghosh and features offices, laboratories, and classrooms for Biology, Chemistry, Communication Sciences and Disorders, Computer Science, Earth, Environment, and Physics, Health Sciences, Nursing, and Occupational Therapy programs.
Learning Resource Center (1971): The center includes the university library, along with classrooms and academic departments, namely the Communication, Criminal Justice, and Visual and Performing Arts, and Information Technology Services and Multicultural Affairs offices. The building also includes campus mail services. In 2010 building was re-clad in its distinctive metallic siding during renovations.
May Street Building (1949): Built as the home of Temple Emanuel Sinai, WSU purchased the multipurpose building in 2015 to house classrooms, auditoriums, the Department of Sociology, and offices for the Center for Business and Industry.
Sagamore Studios: The studios hold visual arts classes within the Worcester Center for Crafts, located at 25 Sagamore Road.
Shaughnessy Administration Building (1932): Named for Helen G. Shaughnessy ('43) who served as a long-time educator and administrator, the building houses administrative offices including the offices of the President and the Provost, and offices for Admissions, Alumni, Development, Financial Aid, Graduate and Continuing Education, Marketing, and the Registrar. The building includes the Fuller Theater, a 166-seat venue created within the original campus auditorium.
Student Center (1978): The center includes student organization offices, meeting spaces, lounges, and dining areas. Included are offices for Career Services, Commuter Services, International Programs, Military Affairs and Veterans Services, and Student Involvement and Leadership Development.
Sullivan Academic Center (1966): The center houses classrooms and offices for multiple academic departments. Included are Business and Economics, Education, English, History and Political Science, Mathematics, philosophy, Psychology, Sociology, and Urban Studies. The center also includes the Sullivan and Eager Auditoriums. Originally the science building, the facility was renamed the Dr. Eugene A. Sullivan Building in 1980 in honor of the fifth university president.
Wellness Center (2016): The newest campus building, the center features multipurpose gymnasiums, exercise areas and classrooms. Included are offices for the Department of Athletics

Residence halls

Chandler Village (1973): The Village is an apartment-style complex that accommodates 420 students. It was the first student housing built on the Chandler Street campus.
Dowden Hall (1990): Named after Vera M. Dowden, a former Education faculty member, the building was expanded in 2010 to include space for 177 students.
Sheehan Hall (2014): Named in honor of James F. Sheehan ('55), a Marine Corps Lieutenant Colonel the hall houses 400 students. It also houses the main campus dining hall, as well as Health Services, the Office of Residence Life and Housing, and recreational facilities.
Wasylean Hall (2004): Named after Phillip M. Wasylean II ('63), the hall accommodates 350 students. The university police station is located on the ground floor. In 2005, the building received an Honor Award for Design Excellence from the American Institute of Architects of Central Massachusetts.

Athletics

WSU Athletics is a Division III member of the National Collegiate Athletic Association (NCAA) in the Massachusetts State Collegiate Athletic Conference (MASCAC), of which it is a charter member. The field hockey and women's tennis teams also compete within the Little East Conference (LEC). Formerly, the men's football team played in the Commonwealth Coast Football (CCC) between 1985 and 2013.

Their main venue is the John F. Coughlin Memorial Field, a two-thousand seat capacity venue that is located on Chandler Street. Teams also use the Wellness Center, Rockwood Park, and the Worcester Sports Center for games. Coughlin Field was the home soccer field of the Worcester Kings of the Premier Development League for their only two seasons before dissolving.

The athletic department currently sponsors men's intercollegiate baseball, basketball, cross country, football, golf, ice hockey, indoor and outdoor track and field, and soccer, and women's intercollegiate basketball, cheerleading, cross country, field hockey, indoor and outdoor track and field, lacrosse, soccer, softball, tennis, and volleyball. Intramural sports include coed soccer, coed flag football, street hockey, dodgeball, wiffle ball, floor hockey, stickball, indoor soccer, ultimate, and softball.

The men's basketball team has reached the MASCAC men's basketball tournament finals five times since the tournament's inception in 1990. They won the championship in 1994, under head coach Tom Moore. The women's team won the 1980 AIAW National Division III Basketball Championship.

The men's hockey team notably won the first three ECAC Northeast Tournaments, namely in 1972, 1973, and 1974, and then again in 1977. However, the team has not won since. They also won the last WCHL Tournament in 1972. The team has also competed in the MASCAC Men's Hockey Tournaments, which began in 2010, and the Codfish Bowl, founded in 1965, but have never won either tournament. The current coach is Shayne Toporowski.

In 2000, Russ Watson of the men's football team set NCAA Division III records for most sacks in a season (24) and most sacks per game in a season (2.7), which still stand today. In 2003, Greg Wood of the men's football team, became the first and only Lancer to receive the Nils V. "Swede" Nelson Award.

In 2016, WSU unveiled a new mascot, named Chandler H. Lancer, at the Worcester Art Museum. The "H" is in honor of President Russell, the university's first leader. The sports teams simply go by the name of the Lancers for both male and female sports.

In 2022, the Worcester State men's soccer team were crowned as MASCAC champions. They went from a record of 3-11-1 in the previous season, to a record of 10-4-7 during the 2022 season. They are led by Coach Aidan Abolfazli (2nd Season). 

The current Director of Athletics is Michael Mudd.

Rankings
Worcester State University is ranked 101st out of 181 Regional Universities in North by U.S. News & World Report.

Notable faculty
 Gerard T. Indelicato (dean)
 Jacob Hen-Tov (history)
 Julie E. Wollman (academic affairs)

Notable alumni

 Bill Adamaitis (1951), professional football player
 Agnes Ballard (1905), architect
 John Binienda (1970), member of the Massachusetts House of Representatives
 Tyler Boudreau (1997), United States Marine Corps veteran
 David W. Breneman (honorary), educator and economist
 Mario J. Bruno (2000), Regional chief executive officer of the American Red Cross
 Kevin Campbell (1973), United States Army veteran
 Mark Carron, member of the Massachusetts House of Representatives
 Brien Cullen (1977), football coach for Worcester State Lancers
 John Dufresne (1970), professor at the Florida International University
 Mary Fell (1969), poet
 Kimberly Ferguson, member of the Massachusetts House of Representatives
 Daniel Garvey (1973), President Emeritus of Prescott College
 Bob Haas, professional football player
 Jimmy Kang (2006), music entrepreneur
 Paul King, National Football League referee
 Todd Leach (1983), Chancellor of the University System of New Hampshire
 Raymond Mariano (1973), former Mayor of Worcester
 Mary McNally (1978), member of the Montana Senate
 Joe Morrone (1963), soccer coach for the University of Connecticut Huskies
 David Muradian (2005), member of the Massachusetts House of Representatives
 Don Nardo (1974), historian and writer
 DJ Obi, disc jockey
 Jim O'Day (1983), member of the Massachusetts House of Representatives
 Steve Palermo (1971), Major League Baseball umpire
 Jim Polito (1985), radio host for WTAG
 Lorine Pruette, feminist
 Tony Reno (1997), football coach for Yale University Bulldogs
 Brian Skerry (1985), photographer
 Aron Stevens, World Wrestling Entertainment wrestler, billed as "Damien Sandow"
 Sarah Ella Wilson (1894), educator
 Geoffrey Zakarian (1981), chef

See also
List of college athletic programs in Massachusetts
List of colleges and universities in Massachusetts
List of NCAA Division III institutions

References

External links
 Official website

 
Public universities and colleges in Massachusetts
Universities and colleges in Worcester, Massachusetts
Educational institutions established in 1874
1874 establishments in Massachusetts